Pero inviolata is a species of geometrid moth in the family Geometridae. It is found in North America.

The MONA or Hodges number for Pero inviolata is 6750.

References

Further reading

 

Azelinini
Articles created by Qbugbot
Moths described in 1898